Winchester is a small town in the South-Canterbury region of New Zealand's South Island. Winchester is 6.9 kilometres north of Temuka and 51 kilometres southwest of Ashburton.

State Highway 1 and the Main South Line railway pass through Winchester.

History 
Winchester was founded by Major John Albert Young. He built the Winchester Hotel in 1863. It was popular with anglers coming to fish the local rivers. Young later built the Wolseley Hotel in 1884.

The Winchester Wool Scouring Works were established in 1869 close to the railway station. They handled 1200 to 1500 bales of greasy wool and around 50,000 sheepskins annually. Winchester was also home to a flour mill, a saw mill and seed cleaning plant and a factory making products out of concrete.

The Temuka and Geraldine Agricultural and Pastoral Association show has been held on the Winchester Domain since 1910.

Winchester had a population of 410 people in 1956.

Demographics
The settlement is part of the larger Waitohi statistical area. 

Winchester had a population of 264 at the 2018 New Zealand census, unchanged since the 2013 census, and unchanged since the 2006 census. There were 108 households. There were 144 males and 123 females, giving a sex ratio of 1.17 males per female, with 51 people (19.3%) aged under 15 years, 33 (12.5%) aged 15 to 29, 129 (48.9%) aged 30 to 64, and 57 (21.6%) aged 65 or older.

Ethnicities were 92.0% European/Pākehā, 6.8% Māori, 5.7% Asian, and 2.3% other ethnicities (totals add to more than 100% since people could identify with multiple ethnicities).

Although some people objected to giving their religion, 59.1% had no religion, 27.3% were Christian, 3.4% were Hindu and 1.1% had other religions.

Of those at least 15 years old, 21 (9.9%) people had a bachelor or higher degree, and 69 (32.4%) people had no formal qualifications. The employment status of those at least 15 was that 105 (49.3%) people were employed full-time, 18 (8.5%) were part-time, and 15 (7.0%) were unemployed.

Education
Winchester Rural School is a year 1-6 primary school with a roll of  students.

Waihi School is an Anglican private year 4-8 full primary school with a roll of  students. The school was established in 1907 and is governed by the Waihi School Trust.

Road safety 
The 50 kilometer per hour speed limit has been extended by 140 metres to the north on the state highway 1 section running through Winchester from the end of October 2020. This is due to concerns from local residents about vehicles travelling through Winchester at high speed. Between 2009 and 2018, there were 15 crashes on the Winchester section of state highway 1. These resulted in five people suffering minor injuries.

Work is almost complete in 2021 building a new roundabout on the intersection of Winchester-Geraldine, Tiplady, McKenzie and Coach roads. This five way intersection has had eight crashes in the previous 10 years. The project funded by Waka Kotahi NZTA cost $2 million. The project has been long awaited by the local community.

References

Timaru District
Populated places in Canterbury, New Zealand